Sweden entered and won the Eurovision Song Contest 1991, held in Rome, Italy.

Swedish broadcaster Sveriges Television continued using their successful Melodifestivalen contest to select their entry for the Eurovision Song Contest. Melodifestivalen 1991 was held on 31 March, where ten artists competed to sing for Sweden.

Carola Häggkvist won the competition after competing for her second time, having come third in 1983. She sang the song "Fångad av en stormvind".

Before Eurovision

Melodifestivalen 1991
Melodifestivalen 1991 was the selection for the 31st song to represent Sweden at the Eurovision Song Contest. It was the 30th time that this system of picking a song had been used. 1,323 songs were submitted to SVT for the competition. The final was held in the Malmö Stadsteater in Malmö on 31 March 1991, presented by Harald Treutiger and was broadcast on TV2 and Sveriges Radio's P3 network. Carola Häggkvist went on to win that year's Eurovision Song Contest in Rome, Sweden's third Eurovision win. The show was watched by 5,880,000 people.

Voting

At Eurovision 
One of the favourites to win, Carola sang eighth on the night of the contest, following Luxembourg and preceding France. At the close of the voting, she had received 146 points, placing joint 1st place with France's Amina. After the four-way tie at the 1969 contest, a tie-break system had been implemented, where a count-back on the number of top points awarded was used. Both countries received four 1st-place votes, but Sweden gained five 2nd-place votes versus two for France, making Sweden the winner. Carola earned Sweden's third ever victory.

Voting

References

External links
TV broadcastings at SVT's open archive

1991
Countries in the Eurovision Song Contest 1991
1991
Eurovision
Eurovision